Solar power in Rhode Island has become economical due to new technological improvements and a variety of regulatory actions and financial incentives, particularly a 30% federal tax credit, available through 2016, for any size project. A typical residential installation could pay for itself in utility bill savings in 14 years, and generate a profit for the remainder of its 25 year life. Larger systems, from 10 kW to 5 MW, receive a feed-in tariff of up to 33.45¢/kWh.

Due to the state's small size and comparatively low insolation, solar installations are limited to predominantly rooftop and megawatt scale installations. Approximately 23% of electricity used in Rhode Island could be provided from rooftop solar panels.

Government policy
The Government of Rhode Island has taken a variety of actions in order to encourage solar energy use within the state. Nineteen schools have installed 2 kW or larger solar arrays that can be monitored on the Internet, similar to the programs in Australia and New Zealand. A variety of solar arrays have been installed at state facilities, which can also be monitored.

Net metering
The state has a net metering program that allows installations of up to 5 MW of on-site electrical generation to continuously roll over any excess generation to the next month, or purchased at avoided cost. Participation is limited to 3% of utilities peak demand for Block Island Power Company and Pascoag Utility District. National Grid has no limit. Peak demand for the state for 2011 was 21,477 MW.

Renewable portfolio standard
The state adopted a Renewable Portfolio Standard (RPS) in 2004 which requires that 16% of Rhode Island's electricity come from renewable resources by 2019.

Statistics

Notable Projects
Forbes Street Solar array in East Providence – Phase I is a 3 megawatt array and was switched on in December of 2013, at the time it was one of the largest solar projects in New England. In December of 2018, Phase II went online with an additional 3 megawatts. 

Brown University, in partnership with Constellation and Energy Development Partners plan to build a 50 megawatt solar power plant in Kingston Rhode Island on a former gravel pit.  The project is estimated to offset approximately 70% of the University's energy consumption and is part of a larger effort to zero out their emissions by 2040.

See also

Wind power in Rhode Island
Solar power in the United States
Renewable energy in the United States

References

External links
Incentives and policies

Rhode Island
Energy in Rhode Island